Giant Panda are an underground hip hop group from Los Angeles, California.

Giant Panda is composed of childhood friends Newman and Maanumental (hailing from Seattle) and Chikaramanga (a Tokyo native), with their foundation based out of Los Angeles, CA.

The trio's name is simply an analogy to their ethnic and cultural make-up. The first single released was "88 Remix" independently in December 2002, with airplay across the globe. The follow-up to that was the acclaimed 12-inch single "With It" in September 2004 on Tres Records. "With It" received raves from print critics such as Chairman Mao from XXL. 2005 saw the release of Giant Panda's first full-length, "Fly School Reunion" (Tres Records). "Fly School Reunion" received great reviews in URB (4 1/2 stars), XXL, XLR8R, HHC, NME, and a plethora of other international magazines. It was also a hit with college radio (3 on CMJ hip-hop charts).

Giant Panda made URB's list of Next 100 in 2005. This buzz allowed the group to tour the West Coast with fellow Angelino hip-hoppers People Under The Stairs and Time Machine. In 2006 GP hit the road with Ugly Duckling for a European tour, and then once again that year reached the EU shores with People Under The Stairs. 20 May 2008 saw the release of Giant Panda's sophomore effort, "Electric Laser". Overall "Electric Laser" was a forward step for Giant Panda, but not so forward to lose fans who appreciated their sound on previous works.

The group cites De La Soul, Jungle Brothers, EPMD and A Tribe Called Quest as key influences

Discography

Promos
Fresh Donuts (2002)

Albums
Fly School Reunion (2005)
Electric Laser (2008)

7" singles
Just Cause (2001)

12" singles
'88 Remix (2002)
With It (2005)
Super Fly (2005)
T.K.O. (2005)
Speakers Pop (2008)

Collaborations
Bloquera (2004) (Newman, Maanumental, Sir Kado, and Superbrush 427)

References

External links
Myspace Page - Currently their "official" site.
Tres Records Artist Page
Tres Records Official Site
PUTS Online - The "official" unofficial fan site of People Under The Stairs. Also has up to date information on Giant Panda.

American hip hop groups